Arthur Bates may refer to:

 Arthur Laban Bates (1859–1934), U.S. Representative from Pennsylvania
 Arthur Bates (cricketer) (1852–1925), English cricketer
 Arthur W. Bates (1883–1972), American silent film actor